This is a list of programs that currently air and formerly aired on Universal Kids and under its former branding as Sprout.

Current programming
1 Also aired on NBC Kids.
2 Also aired on MiTelemundo.
3 Originally on Peacock.

Original programming

Preschool

Acquired programming

Animated

Preschool

Short-form programming

Former programming
This is a list of programs that have formerly aired on PBS Kids Sprout (2005–2013), Sprout (2013–2017), and Universal Kids (2017–present).

Original programming

Animated

Live-action

Preschool

Short-form programming

Acquired programming

Animated

Live-action

Preschool

Short-form programming

Programming from PBS Kids

Blocks
The programming blocks below were all shown under the Sprout banner.

References

 
Universal Kids